The National Anthem of the Udmurt Republic (Šundy sios džuato palėzez) is one of the official state symbols of the Udmurt Republic, a member of the Russian Federation. The anthem's music was written by German and Alexander Korepanov (father and his son). The lyrics were written by T. G. Vladikin (Udmurt version) and A. A. Sheptalin (Russian version).

The use of the anthem in official settings is governed by Law of the Udmurt Republic of October 31, 2002 N55-РЗ "On the National anthem of the Udmurt Republic". This governs the official situations in which the anthem must, or may, be played, and the order in which the anthem is played with respect to the National Anthem of Russia or those of other countries.

Lyrics

See also
 Music of Udmurtia

References 

Anthems of non-sovereign states
Udmurt
Regional songs
Culture of Udmurtia
2002 songs